This is a discography of Dido and Aeneas, an opera by Henry Purcell. The first known performance was at Josias Priest's girls' school in London in the spring of 1689.

Recordings

Critical attention
In Opera on Record, ed. Alan Blyth (Hutchinson & Co./Beaufort Books, Inc., 1983), Graham Sheffield (pp. 11–25) was one of the first authors to supply a comparative discography, praising, for period authenticity, the recordings by Cohen (1978) and Parrott (1981). He found flaws in nearly every recording, but also particular assets, e.g. Roy Handerson in the 1935 recording, Isobel Baillie in 1945, the conducting of Geraint Jones in 1951, several aspects of Lewis's 1961 recording, Peter Glossop in 1965, Mackerras' theatrical instinct in 1967, and Colin Davis' "immense vitality and musicianship" in 1970; apart from Veasey's Dido, he finds sufficient quality in all the vocal contributions to recommend this as the most important 'non-period' recording.
The Haïm recording (2004 in US) received a highly complimentary review from Allan Kozinn, saying it surpassed Parrott's 1981 production, the latter "[u]ntil now, the best." Kozinn noted orchestration and vocal range innovations by Haïm, as well as strong major and minor cast members.

References
Notes

Sources
 Hoasm.org Purcell discography, accessed 6 January 2010
 Operone discography, accessed 14 January 2010
 Prestoclassical discography, accessed 7 January 2010
 Tore Frantzvåg Steenslid's full discography, accessed 7 January 2010

Opera discographies
Operas by Henry Purcell